Lauri Sirp (born 29 October 1969 in Tallinn) is an Estonian conductor.

In 2002, he graduated from Estonian Academy of Music and Theatre in orchestral conducting speciality.

Since 1993, he has been a conductor in Vanemuine Theatre in Tartu. Since 2009, he is also the principal conductor for the University of Tartu Symphony Orchestra. Since 2003, he has also conducted for Estonian National Symphony Orchestra.

He has conducted at Estonian Song Festivals.

Awards:
 2007: Estonian Theatre Annual Award
 2008: Estonian Cultural Endowment Music Prize

References

1969 births
Living people
Estonian conductors (music)
Estonian Academy of Music and Theatre alumni
People from Tallinn